TANS Perú Flight 204 was a domestic scheduled Lima–Pucallpa–Iquitos passenger service, operated with a Boeing 737-200 Advanced, that crashed on 23 August 2005 on approach to Pucallpa Airport,  off the airfield, following an emergency landing attempt because of bad weather, killing 40 of the 98 passengers and crew aboard.

Aircraft and crew
The aircraft involved was a 1981-built Boeing 737-244 Advanced registered OB-1809, which had been leased to TANS Perú from the South African lessor company Safair two months prior to the accident. With manufacturer's serial number 22580 and powered with two Pratt & Whitney JT8D-17A engines, the airframe had its maiden flight on 4 August 1981, and was originally delivered to South African Airways. At the time of the accident, the aircraft had accumulated 49,865 flight hours and 45,262 cycles, and was  years old.

The captain was 45-year-old Octavio Perez Palma Garreta, who had 5,867 flight hours, including 3,763 hours on the Boeing 737. The first officer was 37-year-old Jorge Luis Pinto Panta, who had 4,755 flight hours, with 1,109 of them on the Boeing 737; 38-year-old Gonzalo Chirinos Delgado, a trainee pilot, was also on board. He had 2,700 flight hours, but only 61 of them on the Boeing 737.

Description of the accident
Instead of diverting to another airport, the crew initiated the approach to Pucallpa Airport with torrential rain, hail, and strong winds. Some 10 minutes before the scheduled time for landing, the aircraft started rocking. Realising that the airport could not be safely reached amid the worsening weather conditions, the pilot attempted an emergency landing. The wreckage of the airplane was engulfed by the fire.

With 91 passengers and seven crew members on board, 35 passengers and five crew (including the 3 pilots) died in the accident. Non-Peruvian occupants of the aircraft included 11 Americans, one Australian, one Colombian, and one each Spanish; Italians were also aboard, but the actual number of them depend upon the source. Most of the fatalities were recorded for passengers travelling in the front of the aircraft. Fifty-eight people survived the accident, many of them suffering serious injuries, mostly burns and broken limbs.

Investigation
Investigation of the crash site was hindered by looters, who descended upon the crash and stole various elements to be sold for scrap. A  reward did succeed in securing the return of the flight data recorder. After 312 days of investigations,  no  technical malfunctions were reported. The official cause of the accident was determined to be pilot error for not following standard procedures under adverse weather conditions. The captain took control of the plane, but the trainee pilot did not immediately monitor the instruments; as a result, the crew did not notice the rapid descent in the few crucial seconds they had where they could have avoided danger. According to Aviation Safety Network, the accident ranks among the more deadly ones that took place in 2005. It was also the second major crash involving a TANS Perú airplane in slightly over two years.

In the media 
Flight 204 has been the subject of a Reader's Digest story and an MSNBC documentary. The Canadian TV series, Mayday, has also produced an episode about the accident named "Lack of Vision".

See also 
 List of aviation accidents and incidents involving CFIT

References

External links
Final report 

 
 

Airliner accidents and incidents caused by weather
Aviation accidents and incidents in 2005
Aviation accidents and incidents in Peru
Airliner accidents and incidents caused by pilot error
Accidents and incidents involving the Boeing 737 Original
2005 meteorology
August 2005 events in South America
204